Thomas Wharton, 2nd Baron Wharton (1520–1572), of Wharton and Nateby, Westmoreland, Beaulieu alias New Hall, Essex and Westminster, Middlesex, was an English peer.

Family
Wharton was the eldest son of Thomas Wharton, 1st Baron Wharton, by his first wife, Eleanor, the daughter of Sir Brian Stapleton of Wighill, Yorkshire. After his mother's death, his father married, on 18 November 1561, Anne Talbot, widow of John Braye, 2nd Baron Braye, and daughter of Francis Talbot, 5th Earl of Shrewsbury.

Career
Wharton was knighted in 1545 by Edward Seymour, 1st Earl of Hertford, and in May 1547 married Anne Radcliffe, the younger daughter of Robert Radcliffe, 1st Earl of Sussex, by his second wife, Margaret Stanley, the daughter of Thomas Stanley, 2nd Earl of Derby.

Little is known of Sir Thomas except that he was a companion of Mary I of England. He was with her at Kenninghall when young Edward VI died and Lady Jane Grey ascended the throne for nine days. Sir Tom escorted Mary to Framlingham Castle and, upon her accession, to the Tower of London. He was named Master of the Henchmen and a member of the Privy Council. He served as High Sheriff of Cumberland for 1547 and as MP for Cumberland in 1544–5, 1547, and 1553, for Hedon, Yorkshire in 1554, for Northumberland in 1555, and again for that county as well as for Yorkshire in the parliament of 1557–8.

Being a devout Catholic and supporter of Mary, she had him retained, through personal letters, in Parliament and granted him the Manor of Newhall in Boreham, Essex and a house in London on Canon Row in Westminster.

When Mary died and Elizabeth became queen, Thomas was excluded from Parliament and retired to Newhall. Still continuing to celebrate the Mass, he was eventually imprisoned in the Tower of London in 1561, the same year his wife died.

Seven years later he inherited the title of Baron which he held for four years.

Wharton was a Member (MP) of the Parliament of England for Cumberland 1542, 1545, 1547 and October 1553; for Hedon April 1554, Yorkshire November 1554; Northumberland 1555 and 1558.

Wharton died on 14 June 1572 at his house on Canon Row, and was buried in Westminster Abbey.

Footnotes

References

External links
Wharton, Thomas (1520–72), History of Parliament

1520 births
1572 deaths
Members of the Parliament of England for Hedon
High Sheriffs of Cumberland
English MPs 1542–1544
English MPs 1545–1547
English MPs 1547–1552
English MPs 1553 (Mary I)
English MPs 1554
English MPs 1554–1555
English MPs 1555
English MPs 1558
16th-century English nobility
Barons Wharton